The Men's Individual Standing was an archery competition in the 1996 Summer Paralympics.

The gold medal was won by Ryszard Olejnik, husband of the women's champion Malgorzata Olejnik. In the final he defeated Jean Francois Garcia. The bronze medal match was won by Tae Sung An of Korea.

Results

Qualifying round

Finals

References

Men's individual standing